Joseph Alexander Pirus (born January 12, 1955) is a Canadian retired professional ice hockey centre who played 159 NHL games for the Minnesota North Stars and Detroit Red Wings. He was drafted 41st overall in the 1975 NHL Amateur Draft from the University of Notre Dame by the North Stars. Pirus was also drafted 37th overall in the 1975 WHA Amateur Draft by the Calgary Cowboys but never played in the WHA.

Pirus was born in Toronto, Ontario. He is currently a member of Hockey Ministries International

Career statistics

Regular season and playoffs

External links

Profile at hockeydraftcentral.com

1955 births
Living people
Calgary Cowboys draft picks
Canadian ice hockey centres
Detroit Red Wings players
Fort Worth Texans players
Indianapolis Checkers (CHL) players
Minnesota North Stars draft picks
Minnesota North Stars players
Notre Dame Fighting Irish men's ice hockey players
Oklahoma City Stars players
Ice hockey people from Toronto